Annona jamaicensis is a species of plant in the Annonaceae family. It is endemic to Jamaica. Its pollen is shed as permanent tetrads.

References

jamaicensis
Endemic flora of Jamaica
Taxonomy articles created by Polbot
Plants described in 1906